Agelena choi is a species of spider in the family Agelenidae, which contains at least 1,315 species of funnel-web spiders . It was first described by Paik in 1965. It is commonly found in Korea.

References

choi
Invertebrates of Korea
Spiders of Asia
Spiders described in 1965